Aleksei Vladimirovich Stepanov (born 5 December 1977) is a former Russian professional footballer.

Club career
He made his professional debut in the Russian Second Division in 1995 for FC Zenit Izhevsk.

References

External links

1977 births
Living people
Sportspeople from Izhevsk
Russian footballers
FC Amkar Perm players
FC Shinnik Yaroslavl players
FC Kuban Krasnodar players
Russian Premier League players
Association football goalkeepers
FC Luch Vladivostok players
FC SKA-Khabarovsk players
PFC Spartak Nalchik players
FC Izhevsk players